Aya Salah Jamal-Eddine (born 11 October 1997) is a Lebanese footballer who plays as a defender for Lebanese club Safa.

Early life 
Born in Beirut, Lebanon, Jamal-Eddine moved to Australia at an early age. She played various sports as a child, such as Australian rules football and cricket. Jamal-Eddine returned to Lebanon aged 13.

Club career
Upon her return to Lebanon, Jamal-Eddine trained with the boys' team of Stars Association for Sports (SAS), as the academy were yet to establish a women's sector. Once the women's team was established in 2014, she played in the Lebanese Women's Football League, before moving to Akhaa Ahli Aley the next season. Jamal-Eddine returned to SAS on 18 April 2017. On 14 August 2019, Jamal-Eddine joined Safa; she scored one goal in eight games in the 2019–20 season.

Personal life 
Jamal-Eddine majored in physical education, and obtained a teaching degree. She then decided to pursue an MBA in sport management.

Honours 
SAS
 Lebanese Women's Football League: 2014–15, 2018–19
 Lebanese Women's FA Cup: 2014–15, 2018–19; runner-up: 2017–18
 Lebanese Women's Super Cup runner-up: 2017, 2018

Safa
 Lebanese Women's Football League: 2020–21

Lebanon
 WAFF Women's Championship third place: 2019

See also
 List of Lebanon women's international footballers

References

External links

 
 

1997 births
Living people
Footballers from Beirut
Lebanese emigrants to Australia
Sportspeople of Lebanese descent
Lebanese women's footballers
Women's association football defenders
Stars Association for Sports players
Akhaa Ahli Aley FC (women) players
Safa WFC players
Lebanese Women's Football League players
Lebanon women's international footballers
Lebanese women's futsal players